The Two Mr. Kissels is a 2008 American made-for-television true crime drama film directed by Ed Bianchi and starring John Stamos, Anson Mount, Gretchen Egolf and Robin Tunney. It chronicles the lives and murders of brothers Robert and Andrew Kissel. It originally premiered on Lifetime on November 15, 2008.

Plot
The film starts with the murder of narrator Andrew Kissel (John Stamos), and is told through a series of flashbacks and documentary interviews, telling the story of how embezzling real estate mogul Andrew and his younger Wall Street broker brother, Robert (Anson Mount) meet their untimely ends. The two men compete for the affection of their disapproving father, and try to one-up each other with Robert marrying social climber Nancy (Robin Tunney) and having three children, while Andrew marries TV news analyst Haley (Gretchen Egolf). Nancy starts having an affair and kills her husband in Hong Kong, while Andrew starts doing drugs. Nancy is convicted for Robert's murder and sentenced to life in a Hong Kong women's prison, while Andrew's driver Juan Castillo is arrested for Andrew's murder. Nancy and Robert's daughters are in the custody of his sister, while Haley starts using her maiden name and returns to work.

Cast
John Stamos as Andrew Kissel 
Anson Mount as Robert Kissel
Robin Tunney as Nancy Kissel
Gretchen Egolf as Haley Kissel
Chuck Shamata as Bill Kissel
Tea Jacobson as Deborah Kissel
London Angelis as young Andrew Kissel
John Fleming as young Robert Kissel
Elizabeth Hart as young Deborah Kissel 
Carlos Gonzalez-Vio as Juan Castillo

References

External links

2008 television films
2008 films
2008 crime drama films
2000s English-language films
American crime drama films
Biographical films about fraudsters
Crime television films
American drama television films
Films directed by Ed Bianchi
Films scored by Reinhold Heil
Films scored by Johnny Klimek
Films set in Connecticut
Films set in Hong Kong
Fraud in television
Lifetime (TV network) films
Mariticide in fiction
2000s American films